Jean-Claude Mukanya (born 1 May 1968) is a retired football player from the DR Congo who played as a defender in Belgium for KFC Eeklo, KFC Lommel and Eendracht Aalst, in the Netherlands for NAC Breda and in Israel for Hapoel Be'er Sheva.

External links
 
 

1968 births
Living people
Association football defenders
Democratic Republic of the Congo footballers
Democratic Republic of the Congo expatriate footballers
Democratic Republic of the Congo international footballers
1992 African Cup of Nations players
1994 African Cup of Nations players
1996 African Cup of Nations players
K.F.C. Lommel S.K. players
S.C. Eendracht Aalst players
NAC Breda players
Hapoel Be'er Sheva F.C. players
Belgian Pro League players
Eredivisie players
Expatriate footballers in the Netherlands
Expatriate footballers in Belgium
Expatriate footballers in Israel
Democratic Republic of the Congo expatriate sportspeople in Belgium
Democratic Republic of the Congo expatriate sportspeople in the Netherlands
Democratic Republic of the Congo expatriate sportspeople in Israel
21st-century Democratic Republic of the Congo people